Group D of the 2013 Africa Cup of Nations ran from 22 January until 30 January. It consisted of Ivory Coast, Tunisia, Algeria and Togo. The matches were held in the South African cities of Rustenburg and Nelspruit.

Standings

All times South African Standard Time (UTC+2)

Ivory Coast vs. Togo

Tunisia vs. Algeria

Ivory Coast vs. Tunisia

Algeria vs. Togo

Algeria vs. Ivory Coast

Togo vs. Tunisia

References

External links

2013 Africa Cup of Nations